Vijender Garg   is an Indian politician and was the member of the Sixth Legislative Assembly of Delhi. He is a member of the Aam Aadmi Party and represented Rajinder Nagar (Assembly constituency) of Delhi. He holds a bachelor's degree in commerce.

Early life and education 
Vijender Garg was born in Delhi. He belonged to a middle-class family and being the youngest of all five siblings, he is very close to his parents. His father believed in serving for greater good and actively participated in the wellbeing of people. He was also actively associated with Congress and served the same for 50 years. This as a result encouraged young Vijender Garg to incline towards social service and politics. Vijender Garg as a student, was very sincere and was also involved in co-curricular activities. He was the captain of school and college cricket team and would enjoy most of his free time playing cricket. He got married in 1987 and has three daughters. He considers his wife and his daughters as the strong pillars of his political career, as they stood strong with him during the initial days of election by managing his accounts, planning out the daily schedule, coordinating the programs. Vijender Garg went on to study in Delhi University and graduated.

Political career 
Vijender Garg was the General Secretary of Youth Congress and President of Block Commission Committee in Delhi. But with time when Congress started to divert from its principles, he was disappointed. With the formation of AAP, there seemed a hope to fight corruption in India and thus he joined AAP. Even before entering politics during his college days, Vijender Garg won in union elections. After joining AAP, Vijender Garg campaigned for the party nominee in 2013 Delhi Assembly election. In early 2015 when fresh elections were announced AAP fielded Vijender Garg who has been an AAP volunteer in Rajinder Nagar. Vijender Garg won over his predecessor by a margin of 20050 votes. Ever since then he has been representing Rajinder Nagar Constituency and carrying out various development activities in this constituency. Post becoming MLA Vijender Garg has also held important positions in various committees of Delhi government, Delhi Legislative Assembly. Vijender Garg continues to be in news in developments that took place in 5-year term of the government.

Posts held

See also

Sixth Legislative Assembly of Delhi
2015 Delhi Legislative Assembly election
Delhi Legislative Assembly
Government of India
Politics of India
Aam Aadmi Party

References 

Delhi MLAs 2015–2020
Aam Aadmi Party politicians
People from New Delhi
Living people
Year of birth missing (living people)